Ernest C. Garcia III (born 1982/1983) is an American businessman, and the CEO and co-founder of Carvana.

Early life and education
Ernest Garcia III is the son of Ernest Garcia II. He earned a bachelor's degree in Management Science and Engineering  from Stanford University in 2005.

Career
Garcia began his career as an associate in the Principal Transactions Group at RBS Greenwich Capital. He joined DriveTime in 2007, before co-founding (with Ryan Keeton and Ben Huston) its subsidiary Carvana in 2012, with Garcia as president and CEO since its inception. Carvana was eventually spun out from DriveTime and given an IPO in 2017. At that time, Garcia became chairman of Carvana.

In 2016, Garcia was named Ernst & Young Entrepreneur Of The Year in the Mountain Desert region for the consumer technology category  Garcia, along with Carvana's co-founders, were included in Fortune's 40 Under 40 list in 2017.

According to the Bloomberg Billionaires Index, Garcia's wealth dropped 98% in 2022, as Carvana's stock price continued to fall amid bankruptcy concerns.

Personal life
Garcia lives in Phoenix, Arizona.

References

Living people
American company founders
1980s births
Stanford University alumni
Businesspeople from Phoenix, Arizona
Former billionaires